Georgi Arsenovich Batyayev (born 15 February 1997) is a Russian football player. His last name is also listed as Batayev in some Russian sources.

Club career
He signed a 2.5-year contract with F.C. Ashdod in November 2016.

He made his professional debut for F.C. Ashdod on 25 January 2017 in an Israeli Premier League game against Bnei Yehuda Tel Aviv F.C.

References

External links
 

1997 births
Living people
Russian footballers
Association football midfielders
Russian expatriate footballers
F.C. Ashdod players
FC Tyumen players
Expatriate footballers in Israel
Russian expatriate sportspeople in Israel
Israeli Premier League players
Sportspeople from Vladikavkaz
FC Fakel Voronezh players
FC Ararat Moscow players